Nasser Taghvai (also romanized as Nāser Taghvā'i and Nāser Taqvāyi; born 10 July 1941) is an Iranian film director and screenwriter.

Biography
Taghvāi was born in Abadan. After early experiences as a story writer, he began filming documentaries in 1967. He made his debut, Tranquility in the Presence of Others, in 1970 and gained the attention of Iranian critics. His concern for the ethnography and atmosphere of southern Iran is notable in his films.

Most of his works have been based on novels. Captain Khorshid is an adaptation of Ernest Hemingway's To Have and Have Not, which won the third prize at the 48th Locarno International Film Festival in Switzerland in 1988.

In 1999 he directed a segment of the film Tales of Kish, which was nominated for the Palme d'Or at the Cannes Film Festival.

Filmography 

 Rahaee (Short Film), 1971
 Tranquility in the Presence of Others, 1972
 Sadeq the Kurdish, 1972
 Curse, 1973
 My Uncle Napoleon (TV series), 1976
 Captain Khorshid, 1987
 Oh Iran, 1990
 Tales of Kish ("Greek Ship" episode), 1999
 Unruled Paper, 2001

Awards and Nominations 
 Golden Gate Award for Best Short Film at the San Francisco International Film Festival for Rahaee (Short Film), 1971
 Golden Lion for Best Short Film Award at the Venice Film Festival for Rahaee (Short Film), 1972
 Silver Lion for Best First Work Award at the Venice Film Festival for Tranquility in the Presence of Others, 1972
 Golden India Catalina for Best Short Film Award at the Cartagena Film Festival for Rahaee (Short Film), 1974
 Nominated for Best Director Award at the Fajr International Film Festival for Captain Khorshid, 1987
 Nominated for Golden Leopard and winner of Bronze Leopard at the 48th Locarno International Film Festival for Captain Khorshid, 1988
 Nominated for the Palme d'Or at the Cannes Film Festival for Tales of Kish, 1999
 Special Jury Award (Best Directing) at the Fajr International Film Festival for Unruled Paper, 2002

See also 
Iranian New Wave

References

External links 
 

Iranian film directors
People from Abadan, Iran
1941 births
Living people